The 1997 U.S. Open Cup ran from June through October, 1997, open to all soccer teams in the United States.

Major League Soccer club Dallas Burn prevailed over defending-champion D.C. United, winning 5-3 on penalty kicks after battling to a scoreless draw through extra time. The match was played at Carroll Stadium at IUPUI, Indianapolis, Indiana.

First round
Eight D3 Pro, four PDL, and four USASA clubs start.

Second round
Eight A-League clubs enter.

Third round
Eight MLS clubs enter.

Quarterfinals

Semifinals

Final

Bracket
Home teams listed on top of bracket

Top scorers

See also
 United States Soccer Federation
 Lamar Hunt U.S. Open Cup
 Major League Soccer
 United Soccer Leagues
 USASA
 National Premier Soccer League

External links 
 US Open Cup 1997

U.S. Open Cup
Open